Rowing at the 1912 Summer Olympics featured four events, for men only. All races were held in Djurgårdsbrunnsviken from Thursday to Saturday, 17 to 19 July.

Medal summary

Bronze medals
Bronze medals were not awarded to the losing semi finalists in any of the events, they were instead given diplomas of merit. Although the IOC database currently includes bronze medallists for every event, it is not certain if this an oversight on their behalf or if a retrospective change has been made.

Amateur definitions

The definition for the rowing competitions was:

An amateur is one:

 who has never received payment as a trainer;
 who has never competed for money prizes;
 who has never competed or given a display for payment;
 who has never competed, or given a display, against a professional;
 who has never drawn any pecuniary gain from athletic exercises by selling, exchanging, pawning, or hiring out any prize won in a competition.

An amateur shall be allowed, when taking part in races or displays, to receive his travelling and hotel expenses from the club to which he belongs, or, with the consent of the said club, from the club arranging the competition or display, without forfeiting his amateur status. Payment for such a journey, however, may be made only through the club which he represents in the said competition. No competitor shall be allowed to make any pecuniary gain or profit from such payment.

A professional shall not be allowed to take part in any competitions or displays for amateurs, neither may he officiate as judge or in any other capacity. A professional is one who as a seaman, fisherman, or in any other capacity, has in any way, in the exercise of his calling, engaged in rowing within two years previous to the date of competition.

Participating nations
A total of 185(*) rowers from 14 nations competed at the Stockholm Games:

 
 
 
 
 
 
 
 
 (*)
 
 
 
 
 

(*) NOTE: Both German coxswains from the coxed fours event are counted.

Medal table

References

External links
 International Olympic Committee medal database

 
1912 Summer Olympics events
1912